Gogangra viridescens is a species of sisorid catfish found in Bangladesh, Bhutan, India, Nepal and Pakistan. This species grows to a length of  TL.

References

External links

Sisoridae
Fish described in 1822
Fish of Bangladesh
Fish of India
Fish of Nepal
Fish of Bhutan
Fish of Pakistan
Taxa named by Francis Buchanan-Hamilton